Pilumnoidea is a superfamily of crabs, whose members were previously included in the Xanthoidea. The three families are unified by the free articulation of all the segments of the male crab's abdomen and by the form of the gonopods. The earliest fossils assigned to this group are of Eocene age.

Classification
Pilumnidae is by far the largest of the three families, with 73 of the 78 genera:

Pilumnidae Samouelle, 1819 
 Subfamily Calmaniinae Števčić, 1991 
 Calmania Laurie, 1906 
 Subfamily Pilumninae Samouelle, 1819 
 Actumnus Dana, 1851 
 Aniptumnus Ng, 2002 
 Bathypilumnus Ng & L. W. H. Tan, 1984 
 Benthopanope Davie, 1989 
 Budapanopeus † Müller & Collins, 1991 
 Cryptopilumnus Hsueh, Huang & Ng, 2009 
 Danielum Vázquez-Bader & Gracia, 1995 
 Eohalimede † Blow & Manning, 1996 
 Eopilumnus † Beschin et al., 2002 
 Eumorphactaea † Bittner, 1875 
 Eurycarcinus A. Milne-Edwards, 1867 
 Galenopsis † A. Milne-Edwards, 1865 
 Glabropilumnus Balss, 1932 
 Gorgonariana Galil & Takeda, 1988 
 Heteropanope Stimpson, 1858 
 Heteropilumnus De Man, 1895 
 Latopilumnus Türkay & Schuhmacher, 1985 
 Lentilumnus Galil & Takeda, 1988 
 Lobogalenopsis † Müller & Collins, 1991 
 Lobopilumnus A. Milne-Edwards, 1880 
 Lophopilumnus Miers, 1886 
 Nanopilumnus Takeda, 1974 
 Neoactumnus T. Sakai, 1965 
 Parapleurophrycoides Nobili, 1906 
 Pilumnopeus A. Milne-Edwards, 1867 
 Pilumnus Leach, 1816 
 Priapipilumnus Davie, 1989 
 Pseudactumnus Balss, 1933 
 Serenepilumnus Türkay & Schuhmacher, 1985 
 Serenolumnus Galil & Takeda, 1988 
 Takedana Davie, 1989 
 Viaderiana Ward, 1942 
 Xestopilumnus Ng & Dai, 1997 
 Xlumnus Galil & Takeda, 1988 
 Subfamily Eumedoninae Dana, 1853 
 Ceratocarcinus Adams & White in White, 1847 
 Echinoecus Rathbun, 1894 
 Eumedonus H. Milne Edwards, 1837 
 Gonatonotus Adams & White, in White, 1847 
 Hapalonotus Rathbun, 1897 
 Harrovia Adams & White, 1849 
 Permanotus D. G. B. Chia & Ng, 1998 
 Rhabdonotus Milne-Edwards, 1879 
 Santeella † Blow & Manning, 1996 
 Tauropus D. G. B. Chia & Ng, 1998 
 Tiaramedon D. G. B. Chia & Ng, 1998 
 Viacarcinus † Blow & Manning, 1996 
 Zebrida White, 1847 
 Zebridonus D. G. B. Chia, Ng & Castro, 1995 
 Subfamily Rhizopinae Stimpson, 1858 
 Caecopilumnus Borradaile, 1902 
 Camptoplax Miers, 1884 
 Ceratoplax Stimpson, 1858 
 Cryptocoeloma Miers, 1884 
 Cryptolutea Ward, 1936 
 Itampolus Serène & Peyrot-Clausade, 1977 
 Lophoplax Tesch, 1918 
 Luteocarcinus Ng, 1990 
 Mertonia Laurie, 1906 
 Paranotonyx Nobili, 1905 
 Paraselwynia Tesch, 1918 
 Peleianus Serène, 1971 
 Pronotonyx Ward, 1936 
 Rhizopa Stimpson, 1858 
 Pseudocryptocoeloma Ward, 1936 
 Pseudolitochira Ward, 1942 
 Rhizopoides Ng, 1987 
 Ser Rathbun, 1931 
 Typhlocarcinops Rathbun, 1909 
 Typhlocarcinus Stimpson, 1858 
 Zehntneria Takeda, 1972 
 Subfamily Xenopthalmodinae Števčić, 2005 
 Arges † De Haan, 1835 
 Xenopthalmodes Richters, 1880

Galenidae Alcock, 1898 
 Dentoxanthus Stephensen, 1946 
 Galene De Haan, 1833 
 Halimede De Haan, 1835 
 Parapanope De Man, 1895

Tanaocheleidae Ng & P. F. Clark, 2000 
 Tanaocheles Kropp, 1984

References

 
Crabs
Extant Maastrichtian first appearances
Arthropod superfamilies